Naamah or Na'amah ("pleasant") is a demon described in the Zohar, a foundational work of Jewish mysticism. She originated from and is often conflated with another Naamah, sister to Tubal-cain.

In the Talmud
In Talmudic-midrashic literature, Naamah is indistinguishable from the human Naamah, who earned her name by seducing men through her play of cymbals. She also enticed the angel Shamdon or Shomron and bore Ashmodai, the king of devils. It was later, in Kabbalistic literature like the Zohar, that she became an inhuman spirit.

In the Zohar
According to the Zohar, after Cain kills Abel, Adam separates from Eve for 130 years. During this time, Lilith and Naamah seduce him and bear his demonic children, who became the Plagues of Mankind. She and Lilith cause epilepsy in children.

In another story from the Zohar, Naamah and Lilith are said to have corrupted the angels Ouza and Azazel. The text states she also attracts demons, as she is continuously chased by demon kings Afrira and Qastimon every night, but she leaps away every time and takes multiple forms to entice men.

She makes sport with the sons of man, and conceives from them through their dreams, from the male desire, and she attaches herself to them. She takes the desire, and nothing more, and from that desire she conceives and brings forth all kinds of demons into the world. And those sons she bears from men visit the women of humankind, who then conceive from them and give birth to spirits. And all of them go to the first Lilith and she brings them up.

In other texts
A 1340 Kabbalistic treatise by Bahya ben Asher states Naamah is one of the mates of the archangel Samael, along with Lilith, Agrat bat Mahlat and Eisheth. It is stated Esau took four wives in imitation to him.

References

The Zohar I 55a
Genesis 4:22
Robert Graves and Raphael Patai, Hebrew Myths
E. S. Drower, The Mandaeans of Iraq and Iran, Clarendon Press, Oxford, 1937

External links
Lilith by Alan Humm

Angels in Judaism
Jewish legendary creatures
Demons in Judaism
Qliphoth
Kabbalistic words and phrases
Female legendary creatures